Isla San Felix Airport ,  is an airport serving the Chilean Navy garrison on Isla San Felix, a Pacific island that is part of the Valparaíso Region of Chile.

The runway goes the entire length of the small island, so all approaches and departures are over the ocean. There are no published radio navaids on the island.

See also

Transport in Chile
List of airports in Chile

References

External links
OpenStreetMap - Isla San Felix
OurAirports - Isla San Felix
SkyVector - Isla San Felix
FallingRain - Isla San Felix Airport

Airports in Valparaíso Region
Desventuradas Islands